Hans Dirscherl (4 March 1889 – 16 April 1962) was a German politician of the Free Democratic Party (FDP) and former member of the German Bundestag.

Life 
After the Second World War, Dirscherl joined the FDP in 1949. From 1947 to 1955, he was a member of the Bavarian Senate as a representative of the craft trades. He was a member of the German Bundestag in the first legislative period (1949-1953).

Literature

References 

 
1889 births 
1962 deaths
Members of the Bundestag for Bavaria
Members of the Bundestag 1949–1953
Members of the Bundestag for the Free Democratic Party (Germany)